Seodaesin Station is a station of Busan Metro Line 1 in Seodaesin-dong, Seo District, Busan, South Korea.

External links 
  Cyber station information from Busan Transportation Corporation

Busan Metro stations
Seo District, Busan
Railway stations opened in 1990
1990 establishments in South Korea
20th-century architecture in South Korea